Kenwood High School is a Baltimore County public high school located in Essex, Maryland, United States.

About the School
Kenwood has been educating students since 1931. The school was originally housed at 6700 Kenwood Avenue, Baltimore, MD 21237, which is now Golden Ring Middle School.  The school was relocated to a larger building at 501 Stemmers Run Road, which is less than a mile away from Eastern Technical High School. The school borders the school districts of Overlea High School, Perry Hall High School, Chesapeake High School, and Dundalk High School.

Academics
Kenwood High school received a 39.6 out of a possible 90 points (43%) on the 2018-2019 Maryland State Department of Education Report Card and received a 2 out of 5 star rating, ranking in the 19th percentile among all Maryland schools.

Students
The 2019–2020 enrollment at Kenwood High School was 1649 students.

Demographics
For the 2016–17 school year, Kenwood had 1,619 students.  The enrollment was 47% White, 39% Black, 7% Hispanic, 4% two or more races, 2% Asian, and less than 1% Pacific Islander and Native American.

Magnet Programs
While the school provides a standard diploma to graduates, there are also "Magnet programs," which are "theme-oriented courses of study that provide students with in-depth experiences in a specialized area of interest."  Kenwood features two "magnets": International Baccalaureate (IB) and Sports Science Academy.

The "IB" program is recognized in more than 100 countries, welcoming students to a world of academic leadership and international opportunities. The courses offered in this program are competitive and challenging and encourage creative and critical thinking skills. The IB Program is unique in that it prepares students to take exit exams their senior year to earn college credit.

"SSA" provides students with the opportunity to pursue an interdisciplinary curriculum that investigates careers in the sports, health, and fitness fields, including Sports Medicine, Sports Education, Sports Business, Sports Marketing and Sports Communications

The school is also backwards with the front of the school facing the schoolyard.

Athletics

State Championships
Boys Cross Country
Class A 1956, 1958
Class AA 1962, 1967
Field Hockey
Class A 1947, 1948
Girls Soccer
Pre MPSSAA (Field Ball) Class A 1946
Boys Soccer
4A 2003
Steve Malone Sportsmanship Award 2003
Basketball
Class A 1947
Baseball
Class AA 1978
Boys Track and Field
Class AA 1964

Notable alumni

 Donald B. Elliott, member, Maryland House of Delegates
 Anita Gillette, (1954), actress (stage, television, movies)
 Thomas David Jones, (1973), NASA astronaut
 Dennis F. Rasmussen, (1965), former Baltimore County Executive, Maryland State Senator.
 Michael H. Weir, Jr., member of Maryland House of Delegates

Image gallery

See also
List of high schools in Maryland

References

External links

 

1932 establishments in Maryland
Baltimore County Public Schools
Educational institutions established in 1932
Essex, Maryland
International Baccalaureate schools in Maryland
Magnet schools in Maryland
Middle States Commission on Secondary Schools
Public high schools in Maryland